A. amabilis is an scientific abbreviation. If may refer to:

 Abies amabilis, a fir
 Acanthoscelides amabilis, a leaf beetle
 Achmonia amabilis, an insect
 Acmaeodera amabilis, a beetle
 Acrolocha amabilis, a beetle
 Aedes amabilis, a mosquito
 Afrosphinx amabilis, a moth
  Alcmena amabilis , a jumping spider
 Alstroemeria amabilis, a plant
 Amazilia amabilis, the blue-crested hummingbird
 Amblystomus amabilis, a beetle
 America amabilis, a beetle
 Amphicnemis amabilis, a damselfly
 Anajapyx amabilis, a bristletail
 Anomopsocus amabilis, a barklouse
 Aphaena amabilis , a lanternbug
 Aptenoperissus amabilis, extinct species of wasp
 Arachniodes amabilis, a plant
  Araneus amabilis, a spider
 Aretopsis amabilis, a shrimp
 Aretopsis amabilis , a shrimp
 Aristida amabilis, synonym of Stipagrostis amabilis
 Asclepias amabilis, a plant
 Asceua amabilis, an arachnid
 Astylus amabilis, an insect
 Asura amabilis, a moth
 Auriglobus amabilis, a pufferfish
 Austroargiolestes amabilis, a damselfly
 Austrocardiophorus amabilis, a beetle